Jiang Yinghao (born 27 June 1993), formerly known as Jiang Dongnan, is a Chinese footballer currently playing as a defender for Xiamen Egret Island.

Club career
In 2011, Jiang (under the name Jiang Dongnan) went on trial with Italian club Roma. It was announced by the club that he would sign a contract in the summer of that year.

In 2016, Jiang was suspended for 6 months for fraudulent identity and age documents.

Career statistics

Club
.

Notes

References

1993 births
Living people
Footballers from Qingdao
Footballers from Shandong
Chinese footballers
Association football defenders
China League Two players
A.S. Roma players
AS Trenčín players
Liaoning F.C. players
FC Torpedo Kutaisi players
Chinese expatriate footballers
Expatriate footballers in Italy
Chinese expatriate sportspeople in the Netherlands
Expatriate footballers in the Netherlands
Chinese expatriate sportspeople in Slovakia
Expatriate footballers in Slovakia